Marko Arapović (born 20 July 1996) is a Croatian professional basketball player who last played for Krka of the Slovenian League. He plays at the power forward and center positions.

Professional career
Arapović played in the 2015–16 EuroLeague season with Cedevita.
Arapović severely injured his left knee during an ABA League semi-final play-off match against Partizan in April 2017. After 13 months of rehabilitation he started playing again in May 2018. 

On September 13, 2020, Arapović signed with Split of the Croatian League. Four days later, Split parted ways with him.

On August 17, 2021, he has signed with Krka of the Slovenian League.

National team career
As a member of the Croatia junior national team, Arapović was named to the All-Tournament Team of the 2015 FIBA Under-19 World Cup, where he also won a silver medal.

Arapović was a member of the senior Croatia national basketball team at the 2016 Summer Olympics.

Personal life
Arapović's father is Franjo Arapović, a former professional basketball player.

References

External links
Profile at abaliga.com
Profile at eurobasket.com
 Profile at FIBA

1996 births
Living people
Basketball players at the 2016 Summer Olympics
Centers (basketball)
Croatian men's basketball players
Galatasaray S.K. (men's basketball) players
KK Cedevita players
KK Cibona players
KK Krka players
Olympic basketball players of Croatia
Power forwards (basketball)
Basketball players from Zagreb